"Govinda" is a song by British rock band Kula Shaker, released on their debut album, K (1996). Sung entirely in Sanskrit, the song includes Indian influences and tambura and tabla instrumentation. "Govinda" was issued as a single on 11 November 1996 and peaked at number seven on the UK Singles Chart.

Kula Shaker made a music video for the song, directed by Michael Geoghegan. The cover artwork for the single featured a Longines Conquest watch, with the band logo and song title in place of the Longines branding. An alternative version of the track, called "Govinda '97, Hari & ST. George", appeared on Kula Shaker's Summer Sun EP, released in July 1997.

Background

Lead singer and guitarist Crispian Mills said that the song was born out of an improvisation and based on a Hindu prayer to Krishna. The words Govinda jaya jaya literally mean "Krishna (the Divine Cowherd), Glory, Glory". The text is taken from a Sanskrit devotional chant, titled "Govinda Jaya Jaya". The latter was previously recorded in 1970 by devotees from the London Radha Krishna Temple and released as the B-side of their single "Govinda" (a different song), produced by George Harrison.

Track listings

UK CD1
 "Govinda" (radio mix) – 3:46
 "Gokula" – 2:56
 "Hey Dude" (live at The Astoria) – 5:30
 "The Leek" – 3:40

UK CD2
 "Govinda, Hari & St. George" – 3:59
 "Gokula" – 2:56
 "Govinda" (Monkey Mafia Pigsy's vision) – 6:56
 "Govinda" (Monkey Mafia Ten to Ten) – 4:31

UK 7-inch single
A1. "Govinda" (radio mix) – 3:46
B1. "Gokula" – 2:56
B2. "Temple of Everlasting Light" – 2:33

UK cassette single
A. "Govinda" (radio mix) – 3:46
B. "Gokula" – 2:56

European and Australian CD single
 "Govinda" (radio mix)
 "Gokula"
 "Hey Dude" (live at The Astoria)
 "Drop in the Ocean"
 "Govinda" (Monkey Mafia Pigsy's vision)
 "Govinda" (Monkey Mafia Ten to Ten)

Credits and personnel
Credits are taken from the UK CD1 liner notes and the K album booklet.

Studios
 Recorded between January and May 1996 at various studios

Personnel

 Kula Shaker – writing
 Crispian Mills – writing, vocals, acoustic guitars, electric guitars, tambura
 Alonza Bevan – backing vocals, bass, piano
 Jay Darlington – organ, Mellotron, piano
 Paul Winterhart – drums
 Gauri – backing vocals

 Himangshu Goswami – tabla
 John Leckie – production, mixing engineering
 John Davis – mastering
 Stylorouge – image creation and Graphic Precision
 Trevor Rogers – photography
 Zefa – photography

Charts

References

1996 singles
1996 songs
Britpop songs
Columbia Records singles
Indian mythology in music
Kula Shaker songs
Music videos directed by Michael Geoghegan
Song recordings produced by John Leckie
Songs written by Crispian Mills